Rusty "Travis" Tourneur Sentell, Jr. is a character from the now-cancelled American soap opera Search for Tomorrow. He was played by actor Rod Arrants from 1978 to 1984.

Travis was the son of Rusty Sentell, Senior (David Gale), and his wife, Mignon (Anita Keal). He was a wealthy businessman who brought his family's corporation, Tourneur Instruments, into the fictional community of Henderson.

He was immediately smitten by Liza Kaslo, who had just lost her husband, Steve, to leukemia. After her mother, Janet, refused to bankroll Steve's rock opera on the advice of her legal team, Travis offered to do so. He and Liza eventually fell in love and experienced dangerous adventures. One escapade took place in Hong Kong, where Travis gave Liza a jade necklace. Shady singer Zack Anders (Shawn Stevens) and his villainous manager, Sylvie Descartes (Maureen Anderman), were intent on stealing it but were thwarted. Liza and Travis then married, but his enemies were always around somewhere, and that meant their lives were constantly in danger. Travis also contended with his supposedly deceased father, who was furious that he was married to Liza and wanted Travis to marry his goddaughter, Aja Doyan (Susan Monts).

Travis and Liza also tried to adopt his cousin Lee's (Doug Stevenson) son, Roger Lee, but were thwarted by Lee's wife, waitress Cissie Mitchell Sentell (Patsy Pease). Eventually, they had a son Tourneur Stuart Martin Sentell and Lee, Cissie, and their son left Henderson.

Travis eventually was killed mysteriously; the identity of the murderer was not certain. His uncle, Martin Tourneur, was married to, and then divorced from, Joanne Gardner. This connected Travis to two of the show's long-running characters (since Liza was Stu Bergman's granddaughter). The Travis and Liza story was an attempt by the long-running Search to try to emulate the success of the Luke and Laura story on General Hospital, which was, at the time, highly successful.

References 

Sentell, Travis